Recognise is the debut studio album by British drum and bass production duo Fred V & Grafix. It was released on 31 March 2014 by Hospital Records. It entered the UK Albums Chart at number 106.

A remix album, entitled Unrecognisable, was released on 24 November 2014. It includes the new original track "3D Glasses". "Hydra (Chords Remix)" was released on Beatport in advance as a promotional single from the album.

Singles
"Catch My Breath" (featuring Kate Westall) was first released as part of Hospital Records' We Are 18 compilation, released on 27 January 2014.

The album's lead single "Recognise" was released on 17 March 2014, two weeks before the album. It failed to chart but received airplay on BBC Radio 1. The album's second single, "Forest Fires", features vocals from drum and bass musician Etherwood and was released on 16 June 2014. Originally premiered by UKF, the song accumulated over 250,000 YouTube views and the official video was later posted by THUMP. The song entered the UK Singles Chart at number 77, the UK Dance Chart at number 23 and the UK Indie Chart at number 5, making it the duo's first charting single.

Track listing

Charts

References

2014 debut albums
Hospital Records albums
Fred V & Grafix albums